This is a list of race records in the FIA World Championships, since .

This page is accurate as of the 2023 Saudi Arabian Grand Prix.

Race records

See also 
 Formula One
 Formula One regulations
 FIA
 List of Formula One fatalities
 List of Formula One circuits
 List of Formula One driver records
 List of Formula One constructor records
 List of Formula One engine records
 List of Formula One tyre records

Notes

References

External links
 Formula One Overtaking Database

Race records
Formula One race records